St Pancras and Somers Town is a ward in the London Borough of Camden, in the United Kingdom. The ward was established for the May 2002 election. The population of this ward at the 2011 Census was 13,818. In 2018, the ward had an electorate of 8,798. The Boundary Commission projects the electorate to rise to 9,332 by 2025.

The ward will undergo boundary changes for the 2022 election. Some of its area will be transferred to the King's Cross ward, and some of the area of the Camden Town with Primrose Hill ward will be transferred to St Pancras and Somers Town.

Councillors

Election results
A by-election was triggered in 2015 by the death of incumbent Labour councillor Peter Brayshaw. Labour easily held the seat with more than 70% of the vote.

References

Wards of the London Borough of Camden
2002 establishments in England